Nisang or Nissing  is a city and a municipal committee in Karnal district in the Indian state of Haryana.It is located 20 km west of Karnal on Kaithal Pundri Karnal Highway

History 
Nissing is a religious shrine place as Kurukshetra and it is also known as Nemisar or Mishrak Tirth as per the religious books.It is known as the place of Wiseman vedavyas ji who did penance for long time.

Religious places
 Gurudwara rori sahib

 Shiv mandir temple

 Gurudwara sangatpura

Educational institute

Private Schools 
 Brahmanand public school

https://bpsnissing.com/

 J.P.S Academy 

http://www.jpsacademynissing.com

Arya Sr Sec School, Dacher Road Nissing

 M.S public school 
 Geeta niketan public school
 Nissing public school
 Guru Teg Bahadur Khalsa Sr. Sec. School
 Kinder Garden Pre School

College 

 Mata Sundri Khalsa Girls College

 Govt. Industrial Training Institute, Nissing.

Government school 
 government senior secondary school
 Government girls senior secondary school.

Transport

Railways

The nearest railway station to Nissing is Karnal railway station which is located around 22 kilometer distance. The following table shows other railway stations and its distance from Nissing.

Karnal railway station 22 km.

Taraori railway station	24 km.

Kaithal railway station 40 km.

Roadways
Nissing lies on Kaithal Pundri Karnal Highway.There is a newly built bus stand. Buses are easily available for travelling to the nearby cities Karnal and Kaithal as well as to the major cities like Delhi and Chandigarh.

Villages
There are 49 villages in Nisang tehsil.

References

Karnal district